Northern soul is a music and dance movement that emerged from the British mod scene, initially in northern England in the late 1960s.

Northern Soul may also refer to:

 Northern Soul (54-40 album) or the title song, 2008
 Northern Soul (M People album), 1991
 Northern Soul 2007, a compilation album
 "Northern Soul", a song by Above & Beyond from Common Ground, 2018
 Northern Soul (film), a 2014 British film

See also
 A Northern Soul, an album by the Verve, 1995
 A Northern Soul (Sheridan Smith album), 2018
 Southern soul